Eumichthus is a monotypic genus in the family Cerambycidae described by John Lawrence LeConte in 1873. Its only species, Eumichthus oedipus, described by the same author in the same year, is found in western North America.

References

Cerambycinae
Beetles described in 1873
Monotypic Cerambycidae genera